Greek mythology has consistently served as a source for many filmmakers due to its artistic appeal. Antiquity has been reimagined in many ways and these recreations have been met with great public success regardless of their individual achievements. The plot lines of epic poetry are even more appealing with their enthralling battles, heroic characters, monsters, and gods. And now, with modern technology and computer-generated imagery (CGI), our ability as a society to recreate Greek mythology on screen has improved greatly.

As a scholar of Homer put it,"At the beginning of literature, when heroic poetry reach society as a whole...society listened; in the twentieth century society views... the modern heroic medium is film, and not necessarily the productions that are held in highest critical regard."

Homer's Iliad 
The ancient Greek epic poem the Iliad (Ἰλιάς) details the final year of the decade-long Trojan War. The war began due to divine interaction with mortals: Eris, personification of strife and discord, presented a golden apple to the goddesses Aphrodite, Athena and Hera but instructed that only the fairest of them could keep it. Zeus sends the three women to Paris, the prince of Troy, who decides to award the apple to Aphrodite, who promises to make the beautiful Helen – wife of Greek King Menelaus – his wife. Paris' taking of Helen begins the fighting between the Greeks and Trojans. Although the initial rivalry exists between King Menelaus and Paris, the epic poem highlights the argument between Greek hero Achilles and the Greek King Agamemnon, Achilles' inner turmoil about whether or not he wants to engage in the fighting, and the overall heroic desire for kleos (κλέος, "glory, fame") and eventual nostos (νόστος, "homecoming").

Helen of Troy (1956) 
Helen of Troy is a 1956 epic film based on Homer's Iliad and Odyssey.  Filmed in parts of Rome, the film retells the story of the Trojan War, despite some major changes from the Iliad storyline.

Troy (2004) 
Troy is an American epic adventure war film directed by Wolfgang Petersen.  Based on Homer's Iliad, the film describes the story of the Trojan War following the attack of Troy by Greek forces as well as the stories of those involved.  Although the Iliad describes the story of the rivalry between Achilles and Agamemnon in the ninth year, Troy tells the story of the entire decade-long war.  The film's ending is not taken from the Iliad but from Virgil's Aeneid, showing Hector’s death and funeral instead. The film’s cast includes actors Brad Pitt, Orlando Bloom, and Eric Bana.

Homer's Odyssey 
Another Homeric epic often used in modern film, the Odyssey (Ὀδύσσεια) serves as a sort of sequel to the Iliad. The poem narrates the journey home (or nostos) of Greek hero Odysseus after ten years of fighting in the Trojan War. Like the Iliad, the poem begins in medias res, or "in the middle of things," beginning

Ulysses (1954) 
Ulysses is a fantasy-adventure film based on Homer's Odyssey.  The film tells the story of Ulysses’ attempt to return home after the Trojan War, as well as the adventures that ensue. In the film, actor Silvana Mangano plays both Penelope, the wife of Ulysses as well as the sorceress, Circe. The 1954 film also features actors Kirk Douglas and Anthony Quinn.  Ulysses was a tremendous success which later led to the production of the film Hercules in 1958, which was credited with igniting the Italian sword-and-sandal craze in the 1960s.

L'Odissea (1968)
The Odyssey (L'Odissea in Italian) is an eight-episode European TV miniseries broadcast on RAI (Italian state TV) in 1968 and based on Homer's Odyssey. An Italian, Yugoslavian, German and French Radiodiffusion-Télévision Française coproduction, it was directed by Franco Rossi, assisted by Piero Schivazappa and Mario Bava; the cast includes Bekim Fehmiu as Odysseus and Irene Papas as Penelope, Samson Burk as the Cyclops, as well as Barbara Bach as Nausicaa, and Gérard Herter. Several critics consider the series to be a masterful representation of the ancient world.  The adaptation is considered by some to be the most faithful rendering of Homer's epic on screen, by including most of the characters and events, as well as by attempting to fill with graphic details.

The Odyssey (1997) 
The Odyssey is a British-American fantasy-adventure television series based on Homer's ancient Greek epic poem, The Odyssey.  The miniseries won a 1997 Emmy Award and was nominated for a Golden Globe. The two-part NBC miniseries was filmed in Malta, Turkey, parts of England, as well as places around the Mediterranean where the story took place.

Apollonius Rhodes' Argonautika

Jason and the Argonauts (1963) 
Jason and the Argonauts is an American-British fantasy film made in 1963. Known for its fantasy creatures and iconic fight scenes, the film was released by Columbia Pictures in association with Morningside Productions. The film tells the story of the Greek hero as he leads a team of adventurers in a quest for the legendary Golden Fleece.

Hercules (1958) 
Hercules is an Italian epic fantasy based upon both Hercules and the Quest for the Golden Fleece myths.  The film's screenplay is based loosely upon the myths of Hercules and the Greek epic poem Argonautika by Apollonius of Rhodes.  Hercules tells the tale of the Greek hero as he sails with the Argonauts, experiencing adventure and romance.

Film
History of film